The Gauja Formation is a Middle Devonian fossil locality in Estonia and Latvia. It is named after the Gauja River, where it is exposed along the banks.

Description 
It is composed of weakly to moderately cemented layers of fine-grained to very fine-grained sandstone. The layer is predominantly light to yellowish-gray in color, but can be pinkish brown or variegated. It is mostly composed of quartzose arenites.

The Gauja Formation contains two cyclic members. The lower layers are known as the Sietin Member and are composed mostly of sandstone with a thin layer of siltstone at the top. It has yielded numerous fossils of fishes. Among them are Asterolepis, Bothriolepis, Glyptolepis baltica, Laccognathus panderi, Livoniana multidentata, and Megadonichthys kurikae.

The upper layers are thicker, and the lower part of it is known as the Lode Member. The Lode Member dates from the Middle Devonian and is composed of light colored sandstone. The area is indicative of a near-shore environment of retreating sea. Only large plant remains and miospores are known from this member. Examples of which include Hostinella, Archaeopteris, Retusotriletes rugulatus, and Ancyrospora. Palynological studies indicate that the Middle to Upper Devonian boundary may exist in this member.

See also 
 List of fossiliferous stratigraphic units in Latvia
 List of fossil sites
 Gauja National Park
 Gauja valley

References

Bibliography 
 

Geologic formations of Europe
Geology of Estonia
Geology of Latvia
Devonian System of Europe
Givetian Stage
Sandstone formations
Shallow marine deposits
Devonian southern paleotropical deposits
Fossiliferous stratigraphic units of Europe
Paleontology in Estonia
Paleontology in Latvia